In the x86 assembly programming language, MOVAPD is the name for a specific action performable by modern x86 processors with 2nd-generation Streaming SIMD Extensions (SSE2). This action involves copying a pair of numbers to temporary space in the processor for use in other computations. MOVAPD is one of the fastest ways to accomplish this effect - it is faster than the comparable instruction MOVSD.

Specifically, MOVAPD causes a 16-byte-aligned packed-doubles source to be copied to an XMM register or a 16-byte memory region.

Usage

The source operand can be either an XMM register (xmm2) or a memory address (m128).

The destination operand can be either an XMM register (xmm1) or a memory address (m128). Note, however, that the source and destination operands cannot both be memory addresses.

Potential Exceptions
If a memory address operand is not 16-byte-aligned, a general protection exception (#GP) will be raised. This can cause strange interoperability bugs when ordinary code calls an external code that was compiled with the assumption of a 16-byte-aligned stack frame boundary.

References
 documentation
Intel 64 and IA-32 Architectures Optimization Reference Manual, November, 2006.
Intel 64 and IA-32 Architectures Software Developer's Manual Volume 2A: Instruction Set Reference, A-M, November, 2006.

See also
MOVAPS/MOVAPD
MOVDDUP
MOVHLPS
MOVHPS/MOVHPD
MOVLHPS
MOVLPS/MOVLPD
MOVMSKPS/MOVMSKPD
MOVNTPS
MOVSHDUP
MOVSLDUP
MOVSS/MOVSD
MOVUPS/MOVUPD

x86 instruction listings

X86 instructions